Stuart Gary Tuck (born 1 October 1974) is an English former professional footballer who was most recently assistant manager at Whitehawk. Tuck played as a left back in the Football League for Brighton & Hove Albion until injury put an end to his professional career. Tuck then played as a centre back for many years in non-league football in Sussex.

After being assistant manager at Burgess Hill Town for five years he resumed his playing career with Shoreham in 2018. Tuck then had a spell as assistant manager at his first club Whitehawk.

Career
While at school Tuck played junior football for Bevendean Barcelona and then for Whitehawk U18, where he appeared in midfield as a 15-year old. He was associated with Brighton & Hove Albion as a schoolboy, and joined the club as a YTS trainee when he left school in 1991. He made his first-team debut on 28 September 1993 in the Football League Trophy, and his Second Division debut four days later at the Goldstone Ground in the starting eleven for a goalless draw with Exeter City.

Tuck went on to make 93 league appearances, scoring once, and captained Albion on several occasions. He appeared at left back in the final game at the Goldstone Ground, against Doncaster Rovers in 1997, and the following week played the full 90 minutes against Hereford United in the game that secured Albion's status as a Football League team. Tuck missed the last couple of months of the 1997–98 season with a groin problem that required surgery. He played the whole of Brighton's first three fixtures of the 1998–99 season, but those were his last at Football League level. He received specialist advice that he should "take things easy" as he recovered from the surgery, and ended up retiring from full-time football.

Tuck signed for Isthmian League Division One club Worthing on a non-contract basis in January 2000, where he began as cover for the injured Mark Knee and finished up winning both the Supporters' and the Players' Player of the Year awards for 2000–01.

In October 2001, feeling he had "gone as far as [he] can with Worthing", Tuck joined Southern League Division One club Eastbourne Borough. He remained for nearly five years, won both Player of the Year awards in the 2003–04 season, and was voted Player of the Round for the 2004–05 FA Cup fourth qualifying round. After missing much of pre-season with a calf injury, Tuck started the 2006–07 season out of favour. He spent a brief spell on loan at Isthmian League Burgess Hill Town, He played twice more for Borough, taking his appearance total to 228 in all competitions, and then moved on, to Conference South rivals Bognor Regis Town.

A serious achilles tendon injury in March 2007 put an early end to Tuck's season, but he was still chosen as Bognor's Player of the Year. He was expected to return later in the year once his recovery was complete, but instead rejoined Burgess Hill Town in December. He took on a coaching role as well as playing, until an ankle problem put an early end to his on-field season in January 2009. After manager Jamie Howell was dismissed in March, Tuck was interviewed for the vacancy, but turned it down and left the club. He rejoined Bognor Regis Town ahead of the 2009–10 season, announced his retirement from the game in October, and signed for Eastbourne Town in January 2010.

Tuck joined Whitehawk for the 2010–11 Isthmian League season, and remained as part of the team that won the 2011–12 Isthmian League Division One South title as well as the Sussex Senior Cup final, in which they beat Crawley Down at Brighton's Falmer Stadium. He signed for Burgess Hill Town for a third time, initially on loan, and was then appointed assistant manager in November 2012 after Adam Hinshelwood stepped down.

Tuck was mentioned in connection with the managerial vacancy at Bognor Regis Town in May 2017.

Tuck made a rare start for Burgess Hill Town in the Sussex Senior Cup in January 2018 against Saltdean United, but was sent off early in the second half for a second yellow card. He left the Hillians in September 2018, and subsequently signed as a player for Shoreham where he appeared alongside his son Josh. Tuck re-joined one of his former clubs, Whitehawk, as assistant manager in November 2020, and left in April 2022 when manager Ross Standen was replaced.

Personal life
Tuck was born in Brighton and attended Stanley Deason Secondary School in Whitehawk. He later worked on the PE staff at Varndean School in Brighton.

References

External links

1974 births
Living people
Footballers from Brighton
English footballers
Association football defenders
Brighton & Hove Albion F.C. players
Worthing F.C. players
Eastbourne Borough F.C. players
Bognor Regis Town F.C. players
Burgess Hill Town F.C. players
Eastbourne Town F.C. players
Whitehawk F.C. players
Shoreham F.C. players
English Football League players
Isthmian League players
Southern Football League players
National League (English football) players